Cristian González or Gonzáles may refer to:
Cristian González (footballer, born 1976), Uruguayan defender
Cristian González (footballer, born 1990), Argentine defender
Cristian González (footballer, born 1993), Mexican defender
Cristian González (footballer, born 1996), Uruguayan defender
Cristian Gonzáles (born 1976), Uruguayan-born Indonesian footballer
Cristian "Kily" González (born 1974), Argentine footballer and coach

See also
Christian Gonzalez (born 2002), American football player